The 1957–58 Romanian Hockey League season was the 28th season of the Romanian Hockey League. Four teams participated in the league, and CCA Bucuresti won the championship.

Regular season

External links
hochei.net

Rom
Romanian Hockey League seasons
1957–58 in Romanian ice hockey